The 2013 Scottish League Cup final was the 67th final of the Scottish League Cup. The final took place on 17 March 2013 at Hampden Park, Glasgow. The clubs contesting the 2013 final were SPL clubs, St Mirren and Hearts.

As Hearts finished in the top five of the SPL, they entered the League Cup in the third round. They made a convincing start, defeating Livingston in third round. A much tougher test awaited the Jambos in the shape of Dundee United in the quarter-finals, although they defeated the 2008/09 semi-finalists on penalty kicks. Hearts came up against Inverness CT in the semi-finals at Easter Road and were again victorious on penalties.

St Mirren finished 8th in the SPL and entered the League Cup in the second round. They too made a fantastic start, thrashing Ayr United. Hamilton were the Buddies' opponents in the third round and Danny Lennon's men sneaked through after a goal in stoppage time. The quarter-finals saw the Saints take a trip up to Pittodrie to face Aberdeen, and after a 2–2 draw after extra time, the men from Paisley won on penalties. A trip to Hampden Park for the semi-finals saw St Mirren run out 3–2 winners against Celtic and set up a final against Hearts.
St Mirren won the final 3-2 against Hearts.
It was their first major trophy since the 1987 Scottish Cup victory.

Route to the final

Hearts were one of the five Scottish Premier League sides who entered the League Cup in the third round.
St Mirren finished 8th in the Scottish Premier League the previous season and entered the League Cup in the second round.

St Mirren

In the second round St Mirren faced a home tie against Second Division team Ayr United. Five different players got on the scoresheet for the Saints and saw them through comfortably.

In the next round St Mirren faced First Division team Hamilton at St Mirren Park. Lee Mair's goal in the 92nd minute gave the home side victory.

St Mirren drew with Aberdeen in the quarter-finals, but were victorious on penalty kicks.

St Mirren beat Celtic in the semi-final with a magnificent display. Paul McGowan, formerly of Celtic, was one of the Saints' three goalscorers.

Hearts

In the third round Hearts faced a home tie against First Division team Livingston. Two goals from Marius Žaliūkas and one from Danny Grainger saw the Jambos through comfortably. In the next round Hearts faced fellow Scottish Premier League team Dundee United at Tannadice. Callum Paterson opened the scoring for Hearts before Johnny Russell equalised for the home side.

Hearts beat Inverness CT on penalties in the semi-final. Andrew Shinnie put the Highlanders ahead shortly after half time, but debutant Michael Ngoo struck the equaliser for the Gorgie club.

Details

References

2013
Heart of Midlothian F.C. matches
St Mirren F.C. matches
League Cup
Finals
2010s in Glasgow
March 2013 sports events in the United Kingdom